The 2013–14 Belgian Elite League is a competition between eight Belgian rugby teams. It will start on 8 September 2013 and will end with a final championship game after the playoffs. The final will be held at the King Baudouin Stadium. ASUB Waterloo begin the season as defending champions having won the 2012/13 title.

Season table

{| class="wikitable" width="450px" style="float:left; font-size:95%; margin-left:15px;"
| colspan="2"  style="text-align:center; background:#fff;" cellpadding="0" cellspacing="0"|Key to colours
|-
| style="background: #3fff00;" |     
| Champions
|-
| style="background:#ccf;"|     
|Participants in Championship Playoffs
|-
| style="background: #ff79B4;" |     
|Bottom team is relegated to Division 2.
|}

Championship playoffs

External links
 Site of the Belgian Rugby Federation

2013–14
2013–14  in European rugby union leagues